Ihalakkankanamalage Mahinda Ratnatilaka (also Ihalakkankanamalage Mahinda Rathnathilake) is a Sri Lankan politician and a former member of the Parliament of Sri Lanka.

References

Living people
Members of the 11th Parliament of Sri Lanka
Members of the 12th Parliament of Sri Lanka
Members of the 13th Parliament of Sri Lanka
United National Party politicians
United People's Freedom Alliance politicians
1948 births